Glenn J. Myrthil (born 2 August 1964) is a former Swedish footballer. He made 46 Allsvenskan appearances for Djurgårdens IF, and scored eleven goals.

Honours

Club 

 Djurgårdens IF 
 Division 2 Norra (1): 1985

Notes

References

Swedish footballers
Djurgårdens IF Fotboll players
1964 births
Living people
Association football midfielders